Sinocyclocheilus tingi is a species of freshwater fish in the family Cyprinidae. It is only known from Fuxian Lake in Yunnan. It grows to  SL.

Sinocyclocheilus tingi has been impacted by habitat degradation, overfishing, and introduced species, and its numbers have strongly declined.

References 

tingi
Endemic fauna of Yunnan
Freshwater fish of China